So Alone is the debut solo studio album by Johnny Thunders, then leader of The Heartbreakers and formerly lead guitarist for New York Dolls.

Background and content 

After recording L.A.M.F. with the Heartbreakers, Thunders returned to the studio and recorded his first true solo album, So Alone. The album featured Heartbreakers Walter Lure and Billy Rath, as well as several well-known guest musicians, including Phil Lynott, Steve Marriott, Chrissie Hynde, Peter Perrett, Steve Jones, Paul Cook and Patti Palladin with whom Johnny would later record an album of duets.  The album contained a mix of originals, standards from Heartbreakers live shows, and covers, including the Chantays' surf classic "Pipeline," the Shangri-Las' "Give Him a Great Big Kiss", Otis Blackwell's "Daddy Rollin' Stone" (done with Thunders on the opening verse, Phil Lynott on the 2nd and Steve Marriott on verse 3), and New York Dolls' "Subway Train."

Diss track 

The track "London Boys" was an answer song/diss track from Thunders aimed at the Sex Pistols who had recorded a song called "New York" on their album Never Mind the Bollocks, Here's the Sex Pistols a year earlier, in which they anachronistically attacked Thunders's band New York Dolls for being rip-offs.

Reception 

Trouser Press called So Alone "Thunders at his best." Music critic Robert Christgau named the album one of the few import-only records from the 1970s he loved yet omitted from Christgau's Record Guide: Rock Albums of the Seventies (1981).

Track listing 
All tracks written by Johnny Thunders, except where indicated.

Side one 
 "Pipeline" (Bob Spickard, Brian Carman)
 "You Can't Put Your Arms Around a Memory"
 "Great Big Kiss" (George "Shadow" Morton)
 "Ask Me No Questions"
 "Leave Me Alone"

Side two 
 "Daddy Rollin' Stone" (Otis Blackwell)
 "London Boys" (Billy Rath, Walter Lure, Thunders)
 "(She's So) Untouchable"
 "Subway Train" (Thunders, David Johansen)
 "Downtown" (Thunders, Johansen)

 CD release bonus tracks
Tracks included on 1992 CD reissue:
 "Dead or Alive"
 "Hurtin'" (Henri Paul Tortosa, Thunders)
 "So Alone"
 "The Wizard" (Marc Bolan)

Personnel 
Johnny Thunders – guitar, vocals, producer
Koulla Kakoulli – vocals
Patti Palladin – vocals
Chrissie Hynde – vocals on "Subway Train"
Peter Perrett – guitar, vocals
Steve Jones – guitar
Walter Lure – guitar
Henri Paul Tortosa – guitar
Phil Lynott – bass, vocals on "Daddy Rollin' Stone"
Paul Gray – bass
Billy Rath – bass
Paul Cook – drums
Mike Kellie – drums
Steve Nicol – drums
John "Irish" Earle – saxophone
Steve Lillywhite – piano, keyboards, producer, engineer
Steve Marriott – harmonica, piano, keyboards, vocals on "Daddy Rollin' Stone"
Technical
Peter Gravelle – photography
Molly Reeve-Morrison – project coordinator
Lee Herschberg – remastering
Ira Robbins – producer, liner notes
Bill Smith – art direction, design
Joe McEwan – producer

References 

Johnny Thunders albums
1978 debut albums
Sire Records albums
Real Music Records albums
Albums produced by Steve Lillywhite